Nibanga Temau is the easternmost island of the Reef Islands located in Temotu Province of the independent nation of the Solomon Islands. Nibanga Temau has a length of 3.4 kilometres. The nearest large island is Lomlom.

References

Islands of the Solomon Islands
Polynesian outliers